Tres de Mayo  is a municipality of Paraguay located in the outskirts of Caazapá. Formerly it was part of the district of Yuty, but in 2012 it was elevated to the category of municipality. It has a total area of 743,25 km2 and a population of 17,928 inhabitants in 2016.

References

Populated places in the Caazapá Department